The Ministry of the Interior (Polish: Ministerstwo Spraw Wewnętrznych, MSW) was a ministry responsible for internal security, law enforcement, civil defence and registry functions in Poland. The current ministry was formed on 18 November 2011, when after the parliamentary election of 9 October 2011 there was a call to restructure the then Ministry of Interior and Administration, from which it was split. In late 2015 it was folded back to Ministry of Interior and Administration.

The last minister was Mariusz Błaszczak.

History and function
The ministry was founded in 1918. It has gone through several reforms, including partial splits and mergers, throughout its history.

The post of Minister of the Interior is one of the most important cabinet positions in Poland, According to the directive of the 'President of Council of Ministers' (Prime Minister) from 18 November 2011, the Minister of the Interior is responsible for:

 The general interior security of the country, with respect to criminal acts or natural catastrophes
 including the major law-enforcement agencies (see law enforcement in Poland)
 the Polish National Police - safety and public order protection
 State borders' protection, regulation of migration policy and preventing illegal immigration
 the Polish Border Guard (Straż Graniczna)
 Civil defence and crisis management
 the State Fire Service
 Search and rescue and the oversight of ambulance services
 the granting of identity documents (Polish passports, identity cards) and driving licenses through the network of voivodeships
 relations between the central government and local governments (except in the case of regional development, which is undertaken by the Ministry of Regional Development
 logistics and organization of political elections, at the national and voivodeship levels (but the results of the elections are overseen by the Supreme Court of Poland)
 integration and registration of legal immigrants
 civil registry functions: marital status registration, change of names or surnames

While the ministry of the Interior supervises police forces, it does not supervise criminal enquiries; criminal enquiries are conducted under the supervision of the judiciary.

The ministry's seat is located on Stefan Batory Street, south of Warsaw's city centre and in the governmental district which surrounds the Belweder. The Ministry can be referred to by its initials 'MSW'.

Ministers of the Interior (since 1989) 
Political Party:

Other officeholders

Ministers of Internal Affairs of the Second Republic of Poland
Stanisław Thugutt 17 November 1918 – 16 January 1919
Stanisław Wojciechowski 16 January 1919 – 9 December 1919
Stanisław Wojciechowski 13 December 1919 – 9 June 1920
Józef Kuczyński (kierownik) 23 June 1920 – 24 July 1920
Leopold Skulski 24 July 1920 – 28 June 1921
Władysław Raczkiewicz 28 June 1921 – 13 September 1921
Stanisław Downarowicz 19 September 1921 – 5 March 1922
Antoni Kamieński 10 March 1922 – 6 June 1922
Antoni Kamieński 28 June 1922 – 31 July 1922
Antoni Kamieński 31 July 1922 – 16 December 1922
Władysław Sikorski 16 December 1922 – 26 May 1923
Władysław Kiernik 28 May 1923 – 15 December 1923
Władysław Sołtan 17 December 1923 – 21 March 1924
Zygmunt Hubner 21 March 1924 – 17 November 1924
Cyryl Ratajski 17 November 1924 – 14 June 1925
Władysław Raczkiewicz 15 June 1925 – 13 November 1925
Władysław Raczkiewicz 20 November 1925 – 5 May 1926
Stefan Smólski 10 May 1926 – 15 May 1926
Kazimierz Młodzianowski 15 May 1926 – 8 June 1926
Kazimierz Młodzianowski 8 June 1926 – 24 November 1926
Kazimierz Młodzianowski 27 September 1926 – 30 September 1926
Felicjan Sławoj Składkowski 2 October 1926 – 27 June 1928
Felicjan Sławoj Składkowski 27 June 1928 – 13 April 1929
Felicjan Sławoj Składkowski 14 April 1929 – 29 December 1929
Henryk Józewski 29 December 1929 – 17 March 1930
Henryk Józewski 29 March 1930 – 3 June 1930
Felicjan Sławoj Składkowski 3 June 1930 – 23 August 1930
Felicjan Sławoj Składkowski 25 August 1930 – 4 December 1930
Felicjan Sławoj Składkowski 4 December 1930 – 26 May 1931
Felicjan Sławoj Składkowski 27 May 1931 – 23 June 1931
Bronisław Pieracki 23 June 1931 – 9 May 1933
Bronisław Pieracki 10 May 1933 – 13 May 1934
Bronisław Pieracki 15 May 1934 – 15 June 1934
Leon Kozłowski 16 June 1934 – 28 June 1934
Marian Zyndram-Kościałkowski 28 June 1934 – 28 March 1935
Marian Zyndram-Kościałkowski 28 March 1935 – 12 October 1935
Władysław Raczkiewicz 13 October 1935 – 15 May 1936
Felicjan Sławoj-Składkowski 16 May 1936 – 30 September 1939

Ministers of Public Security
 Stanisław Radkiewicz (PPR) 31 December 1944 -  7 December 1954

Ministers of Internal Affairs of People's Republic of Poland
 Władysław Wicha (PZPR) 7 December 1954 – 12 December 1964
 Mieczysław Moczar (PZPR) 12 December 1964 – 15 July 1968
 Kazimierz Świtała (PZPR) 15 July 1968 – 13 February 1971
 Franciszek Szlachcic (PZPR) 13 February 1971 – 22 December 1971
 Wiesław Ociepka (PZPR) 22 December 1971 – 28 February 1973
 Stanisław Kowalczyk (PZPR) 22 March 1973 – 8 October 1980
 Mirosław Milewski (PZPR) 8 October 1980 – 31 July 1981
 Czesław Kiszczak (PZPR) 31 July 1981 – 6 July 1990

References 

Interior
Poland
Poland, Interior
Former ministries
2015 disestablishments in Poland
2011 establishments in Poland
Defunct organisations based in Poland